Kiyevskaya is a Moscow Metro station in the Dorogomilovo District, Western Administrative Okrug, Moscow. It is on the Koltsevaya Line, between Park Kultury and Krasnopresnenskaya stations. It is named after the nearby Kiyevsky Rail Terminal. The design for the station was chosen in an open competition held in Ukraine; the entry submitted by the team of E. I. Katonin, V. K. Skugarev, and G. E. Golubev placed first among 73 others and it became the final design. Kievskaya features low, square pylons faced with white marble and surmounted by large mosaics by A.V. Myzin celebrating Russo-Ukrainian unity. Both the mosaics and the arches between the pylons are edged with elaborate gold-colored trim. At the end of the platform is a portrait of Vladimir Lenin.

The entrance to the station, which is shared with both of the other two Kievskaya stations, is built into the Kiev railway station. With the completion of the segment of track between Belorusskaya and Park Kultury in 1954 the Koltsevaya Line became fully operational with trains running continuously around the loop for the first time.

One of the station's entrances is topped by a reproduction of an Art Nouveau Paris Metro entrance by Hector Guimard, given by the Régie autonome des transports parisiens in 2006 in exchange for an artwork by Russian artist Ivan Lubennikov installed at Madeleine station in Paris.

Transfers
From this station passengers can transfer to Kiyevskaya on the Arbatsko-Pokrovskaya Line and Kiyevskaya on the Filyovskaya Line.

References

Moscow Metro stations
Stalinist architecture
Railway stations in Russia opened in 1954
Koltsevaya Line
Art Nouveau architecture in Moscow
Art Nouveau railway stations
Railway stations located underground in Russia
Cultural heritage monuments of regional significance in Moscow